Christos Tsountas (1857 – 9 June 1934) was a Greek classical archaeologist. He was born in Thracian Stenimachos, Ottoman Empire (present-day Asenovgrad in Bulgaria) and attended Zariphios high school in Plovdiv. In 1886, he discovered and identified the Mycenean palace at Tiryns. He also conducted important excavations at the palace of Mycenae, and he conducted surveys of the Greek mainland and identified more Mycenean and early Bronze Age sites. Tsountas investigated burial sites on several islands of the Cyclades, such as the important site of Kastri in Syros. Between 1898 and 1899, his investigations led him to coin the term "Cycladic civilization". He also conducted archaeological excavations at Sesklo, Agios Andreas, and Dimini. Tsountas also led the first scientific excavations at Amyclae. 

Tsountas died in Athens.

Publications (selection)
Tsountas, Chrestos & Manatt, J. Irving: The Mycenean Age: a study of the monuments and culture of pre-Homeric Greece. London: Macmillan, 1897.
Tsountas, Chrestos: Ai proistorikai Akropoleis Dimeniou kai Sesklou. Athens 1908.

External links
About: Christos Tsountas

1857 births
1934 deaths
Greek archaeologists
Tsountas
People from Asenovgrad
Academic staff of the National and Kapodistrian University of Athens
Archaeologists of the Bronze Age Aegean
Members of the Academy of Athens (modern)
Bulgarian people of Greek descent